Ecofascism is a term which is used to describe individuals and groups which combine environmentalism with fascist viewpoints and tactics. Originally, the term "ecofascist" was considered an academic term for a hypothetical type of government which would militantly enforce environmental measures over the needs and freedoms of its citizens.

In non-academic circles, the term "ecofascist" was originally used as a slur against the emerging environmental movement from the 1970s onwards, with André Gorz speaking of eco-fascism as early as 1977 to characterize (feared) forms of totalitarianism based on an exclusively ecological orientation of politics. However, since the 2010s, a number of individuals and groups have emerged that either self-identify as "ecofascist" or have been labelled so by academic or journalistic sources. These individuals and groups synthesise radical far-right politics with environmentalism and will typically advocate that overpopulation is the primary threat to the environment and that the only solution is to completely halt immigration, or at their most extreme, actively commit genocide against minority groups and ethnicities. As environmentalism has become more and more mainstream in recent decades, many far-right political parties have experimented with adding green politics to their platforms, while since the 2010s a number of terrorists internationally have cited ecofascism as their motive.

Definition 
In 2005, environmental historian Michael E. Zimmerman defined "ecofascism" as "a totalitarian government that requires individuals to sacrifice their interests to the well-being of the 'land', understood as the splendid web of life, or the organic whole of nature, including peoples and their states". Zimmerman argued that while no ecofascist government has existed so far, "important aspects of it can be found in German National Socialism, one of whose central slogans was "Blood and Soil". Other political agendas instead of environmental protection and prevention of climate change are nationalist approaches to climate such as national economic environmentalism and securitization of climate change.

Vice has defined ecofascism as an ideology "which blames the demise of the environment on overpopulation, immigration, and over-industrialization, problems that followers think could be partly remedied through the mass murder of refugees in Western countries." Environmentalist author Naomi Klein has suggested that ecofascists' primary objectives are to close borders to immigrants and, on the more extreme end, to embrace the idea of climate change as a divinely-ordained signal to begin a mass purge of sections of the human race. Ecofascism is "environmentalism through genocide", opined Klein. Political researcher Alex Amend defined ecofascist belief as "The devaluing of human life—particularly of populations seen as inferior—in order to protect the environment viewed as essential to White identity."

Terrorism researcher Kristy Campion defined ecofascism as "a reactionary and revolutionary ideology that champions the regeneration of an imagined community through a return to a romanticised, ethnopluralist vision of the natural order."

Helen Cawood and Xany Jansen Van Vuuren have criticised previous attempts to define ecofascism as focussing too heavily on environmental and ecological conservationism in historical fascist movements, and their definitions being too broad and encompassing many ontologically different ideologies. In their criticism they summarise the current definition of ecofascism as used in the academic literature as "a movement that uses environmental and ecological conservationist talking points to push an ideology of ethnic or racial separatism".

Ideological origins

Madison Grant 
Sometimes dubbed the "founding father" of ecofascism, Madison Grant was a pioneer of conservationism in America in the late 19th and early 20th century. Grant is credited as a founder of modern wildlife management. Grant built the Bronx River Parkway, was a co-founder of the American Bison Society, and helped create Glacier National Park, Olympic National Park, Everglades National Park and Denali National Park. As president of the New York Zoological Society, he founded the Bronx Zoo in 1899.

In addition to his conservationist work, Grant was a trenchant racist. In 1906, Grant supported the placement of Ota Benga, a member of the Mbuti people who was kidnapped, removed from his home in the Congo, and put on display in the Bronx Zoo as an exhibit in the Monkey House. In 1916, Grant wrote The Passing of the Great Race, a work of pseudoscientific literature which claimed to give an account of the anthropological history of Europe. The book divides Europeans into three races; Alpines, Mediterraneans and Nordics, and it also claims that the first two races are inferior to the superior Nordic race, which is the only race which is fit to rule the earth. Adolf Hitler would later describe Grant's book as "his bible" and Grant's "Nordic theory" became the bedrock of Nazi racial theories. Additionally, Grant was a eugenicist: He was the director of the American Eugenics Society and he also advocated the culling of the unfit from the human population. Grant concocted a 100-year plan to perfect the human race, a plan in which one ethnic group after another would be killed off until racial purity would be obtained. Grant campaigned for the passage of the Emergency Quota Act of 1921 and he also campaigned for the passage of the Immigration Restriction Act of 1924, which drastically reduced the number of immigrants from Eastern Europe and Asia who were allowed to enter the United States.

In the modern era, Grant's ideas have been cited by advocates of far-right politics such as Richard Spencer and Anders Breivik.

Nazism 
The authors Janet Biehl and Peter Staudenmaier suggest that the synthesis of fascism and environmentalism began with Nazism, stating that 19th and 20th century Germany was early ground of ecofascist thought, finding its antecedents in many prominent natural scientists and environmentalists, including Ernst Moritz Arndt, Wilhelm Heinrich Riehl, and Ernst Haeckel. With the works and ideas of such individuals being later established as policies in the Nazi regime. This is supported by other researchers who identify the Völkisch movement as an ideological originator of later ecofascism. In Biehl and Staudenmaier's book Ecofascism: Lessons from the German Experience, they note the Nazi Party's interest in ecology, and suggest their interest was "linked with traditional agrarian romanticism and hostility to urban civilization". With Zimmerman pointing to the works of conservationist and Nazi Walther Schoenichen as having pertinence to later ecofascism and similarities to developments in deep ecological understanding. During the Nazi rise to power, there was strong support for the Nazis among German environmentalists and conservationists. Richard Walther Darré, a leading Nazi ideologist who invented the term "Blood and Soil", developed a concept of the nation having a mystic connection with their homeland, and as such, the nation was dutybound to take care of the land. Because of this, modern ecofascists cite the Nazi Party as an origin point of ecofascism. Beyond Darré, Rudolf Hess and Fritz Todt are viewed as representatives of environmentalism within the Nazi party. Roger Griffin has also pointed to the glorification of wildlife in Nazi art and ruralism in the novels of the fascist sympathizers Knut Hamsun and Henry Williamson as examples.

After the outlawing of the neo-nazi Socialist Reich Party, one of its members August Haußleiter moved towards organizing within the environmental and anti-nuclear movements, going on to become a founding member of the German Green Party. When green activists later uncovered his past activities in the neo-nazi movement, Haußleiter was forced to step down as the party's chairman, although he continued to hold a central role in the party newspaper. As efforts to expel nationalist elements within the party continued, a conservative faction split off and founded the Ecological Democratic Party, which became noted for persistent holocaust denial, rejection of social justice and opposition to immigration.

Savitri Devi 

The French-born Greek fascist Savitri Devi (born Maximiani Julia Portas) was a prominent proponent of Esoteric Nazism and deep ecology. A fanatical supporter of Hitler and the Nazi Party from the 1930s onwards, she also supported animal rights activism and was a vegetarian from a young age. She put forward ecologist views in her works, such as the Impeachment of Man (1959), in which she declared her views on animal rights and nature. According to her, human beings do not stand above the animals; but in her ecologist views, humans are rather a part of the ecosystem and should respect all life, including animals and the whole of nature. Because of her dual devotion to both Nazism and deep ecology, she is considered an influential figure in ecofascist circles.

Ted Kaczynski, the Unabomber 

Ted Kaczynski, better known as "The Unabomber", is a figure cited as highly influential upon ecofascist thought. Between 1978 and 1995 Kaczynski instigated a terrorist bombing campaign aimed at inciting a revolution against modern industrial society, in the name of returning humanity to a primitive state he suggested offered humanity more freedom while protecting the environment. In 1995 Kaczynski offered to end his bombing campaign if The Washington Post or The New York Times would publish his 35,000-word Unabomber manifesto. Hoping to save lives, both newspapers agreed to those terms. The manifesto railed not only against modern industrial society but also against "modern leftists", whom Kaczynski defined as "mainly socialists, collectivists, 'politically correct' types, feminists, gay and disability activists, animal rights activists and the like".

Because of Kaczynski's intelligence and ability to write in a high-level academic tone, his manifesto was given serious consideration upon release and became highly influential, even amongst those who severely disagreed with his use of violence. Kaczynski's staunchly radical pro-green, anti-left work was quickly absorbed into ecofascist thought.

Kaczynski also criticized the right wing for their support for technological and economic progress while complaining about a decay of tradition, stating that technology erodes traditional social mores that conservatives and right wingers want to protect, and referred to conservatives as fools.

Although Kaczynski and his manifesto has been embraced by ecofascists, he rejected 'fascism', including specifically "the 'ecofascists'", describing 'ecofascism' itself as 'an aberrant branch of leftism':
 

In his manifesto Kaczynski wrote that he considered fascism a "kook ideology" and Nazism as "evil". Kaczynski never tried to align himself with the far-right at any point before or after his arrest.

In 2017 Netflix released a dramatisation of Kaczynski's life, entitled Manhunt: Unabomber. The popularity of the show thrust Kaczynski and his manifesto once again into the public's mind and raised the profile of ecofascism.

Garrett Hardin, Pentti Linkola, and "Lifeboat Ethics" 

Two figures influential in ecofascism are Garrett Hardin and Pentti Linkola, both of whom were proponents of what they refer to as "Lifeboat Ethics". Hardin was an American ecologist accused by the Southern Poverty Law Center of being a white nationalist, whilst Linkola was a Finnish ecologist accused of being an active ecofascist who actively advocated ending democracy and replacing it with dictatorships that would use totalitarian and even genocidal tactics to end climate change. Both men used versions of the following analogy to illustrate their viewpoint:

Association with violence 
Academics and researchers warn that as ecological crises worsen and remain unaddressed, support for ecofascism and violence in the name of ecofascism will increase.

In December 2020, the Swedish Defence Research Agency released a report on ecofascism. The paper argued that ecofascism is intimately tied to the ideology of accelerationism, and ecofascists nearly exclusively choose terror tactics over the political approach. Further, the SDRA argues not all ecofascist mass shooters have been recognized as such: Pekka-Eric Auvinen who shot eight people in Finland in 2007 before killing himself adhered to the ideology according to his manifesto titled "The Natural Selector's Manifesto". He advocated "total war against humanity" due to the threat humanity posed to other species. He wrote that death and killing is not a tragedy, as it constantly happens in nature between all species. Auvinen also wrote that the modern society hinders "natural justice" and that all inferior "subhumans" should be killed and only the elite of humanity be spared. In one of his YouTube videos Auvinen paid tribute to the prominent ecofascist Pentti Linkola.

James Jay Lee, the eco-terrorist who took several hostages at the Discovery Communications headquarters on 1 September 2010, was described as an ecofascist by Mark Potok of the Southern Poverty Law Center.

William H. Stoetzer, a member of the Atomwaffen Division, an organization responsible for at least eight murders, was active in the Earth Liberation Front as late as 2008 and joined Atomwaffen in 2016.

Brenton Tarrant, the Australian-born perpetrator of the Christchurch mosque shootings in New Zealand described himself as an ecofascist,ethno-nationalist, and racist in his manifesto The Great Replacement, named after a far-right conspiracy theory originating in France. Jordan Weissmann, writing for Slate, describes the perpetrator's version of ecofascism as "an established, if somewhat obscure, brand of neo-Nazi" and quotes Sarah Manavis of New Statesman as saying, "[Eco-fascists] believe that living in the original regions a race is meant to have originated in and shunning multiculturalism is the only way to save the planet they prioritise above all else". Similarly, Luke Darby clarifies it as: "eco-fascism is not the fringe hippie movement usually associated with ecoterrorism. It's a belief that the only way to deal with climate change is through eugenics and the brutal suppression of migrants."

Patrick Crusius, the perpetrator of the 2019 El Paso shooting wrote a similar manifesto, professing support for Tarrant. Posted to the online message board 8chan, it blames immigration to the United States for environmental destruction, saying that American lifestyles were "destroying the environment", invoking an ecological burden to be borne by future generations, and concluding that the solution was to "decrease the number of people in America using resources". Crusius and Tarrant also inspired Philip Manshaus who attacked a mosque in Norway in 2019.

The Swedish self-identified ecofascist Green Brigade is an eco-terrorist group linked to The Base that is responsible for multiple mass murder plots. The Green Brigade has been responsible for arson attacks against targets deemed to be enemies of nature, like an attack on a mink farm that caused multi-million-dollar damages. Two members were arrested by Swedish police, allegedly planning assassinating judges and bombings.

Payton S. Gendron, the instigator of the 2022 Buffalo shooting, also wrote a manifesto self-describing as "an ethno-nationalist eco-fascist national socialist" within it and also professing support for far-right shooters from Tarrant and Dylann Roof to Anders Behring Breivik and Robert Bowers.

Critiques 
The deep ecologic activist and "left biocentrism" advocate David Orton stated in 2000 that the term is pejorative in nature and it has "social ecology roots, against the deep ecology movement and its supporters plus, more generally, the environmental movement. Thus, 'ecofascist' and 'ecofascism', are used not to enlighten but to smear." Orton argued that "it is a strange term/concept to really have any conceptual validity" as there has not "yet been a country that has had an "eco-fascist" government or, to my knowledge, a political organization which has declared itself publicly as organized on an ecofascist basis."

Accusations of ecofascism have often been made but are usually strenuously denied. Left wing critiques view ecofascism as an assault on human rights, as in social ecologist Murray Bookchin's use of the term.

Deep ecology 

Deep ecology is an environmental philosophy that promotes the inherent worth of all living beings regardless of their instrumental utility to human needs. It has long been linked fascist ideologies, both by critics and fascist proponents. In certain texts, the Norwegian philosopher Arne Næss, a leading voice of the "Deep ecology" movement, opposes environmentalism and humanism, even proclaiming, in imitation of a famous phrase of the Marquis de Sade,  ("Ecologists, another effort to become anti-humanists!"). Luc Ferry, in his anti-environmentalist book  published in 1992, particularly incriminated deep ecology as being an anti-humanist ideology bordering on Nazism.

Bookchin's critique of deep ecology 
Murray Bookchin criticizes the political position of deep ecologists such as David Foreman:

There are barely disguised racists, survivalists, macho Daniel Boones, and outright social reactionaries who use the word ecology to express their views, just as there are deeply concerned naturalists, communitarians, social radicals, and feminists who use the word ecology to express theirs... It was out of this former kind of crude eco-brutalism that Hitler, in the name of "population control," with a racial orientation, fashioned theories of blood and soil...

The same eco-brutalism now reappears a half-century later among self-professed deep ecologists who believe that Third World peoples should be permitted to starve to death and that desperate Indian immigrants from Latin America should be excluded by the border cops from the United States lest they burden "our" ecological resources.

Sakai on "natural purity" 
Such observations among the left are not exclusive to Bookchin. In his review of Anna Bramwell's biography of Richard Walther Darré, political writer J. Sakai and author of Settlers: The Mythology of the White Proletariat, observes the fascist ideological undertones of natural purity.

Narrowness of the label 
Political scientist Balša Lubarda has criticised the use of the term "ecofascism" as not sufficiently covering and describing the wider network of ideologies and systems that feed into ecofascist action, suggesting the term "far-right ecologism" (FRE) instead. Lubarda is supported by researcher Bernhard Forchtner who emphasises ecofascism's existence as a fringe ideology that has had little impact on the wider far-right's interaction with environmentalism.

Far-right green movements

Austria 
 (DGÖ) had been founded in 1982 by the former NDP official Alfred Bayer to use the popularity of the green movement at the time for the purposes of the NDP. The party managed to win a number of municipal seats in the mid-1980s but in 1988 the Constitutional Court banned the party on grounds of Neo-Nazism alongside a parallel ban on the NDP.

France

Nouvelle Droite movement 
The European  movement, developed by Alain de Benoist and other individuals involved with the GRECE think tank, have also combined various left-wing ideas, including green politics, with right-wing ideas such as European ethnonationalism. Various other far-right figures have taken the lead from de Benoist, providing an appeal to nature in their politics, including: Guillaume Faye, Renaud Camus, and Hervé Juvin.

Génération identitaire 

Germany 
Staudenmaier points to how from the post-war period in Germany an ecofascist section has always been present in the German far-right, though as a minor peripheral section.

The NPD 

The National Democratic Party of Germany (NPD), a German Nationalist Far right party, has recently supported the green movement. This is one of many strategies the party has used to try to gain supporters.

The German far-right has published the magazine , that masquerades as a garden and nature publication but intertwines garden tips with extremist political ideology. This is known as a “camouflage publication” in which the NPD has spread its mission and ideologies through a discrete source and made its way into homes they otherwise wouldn’t. Right-wing environmentalists are settling in the northern regions of rural Germany and are forming nationalistic and authoritarian communities which produce honey, fresh produce, baked goods, and other such farm goods for profit. Their ideology is centered around “blood and soil” ruralism in which they humanely raise produce and animals for profit and sustenance. Through their support of this operation, and the backing of many others, it’s reported that the NPD is trying to wrestle the green movement, which has been dominated by the left since the 1980s, back from the left through these avenues.

It’s difficult to know if when one is buying local produce or farm fresh eggs from a farmer at their stand, they’re supporting a right-wing agenda. Various efforts are being made to halt or slow the infiltration of right-wing ecologists into the community of organic farmers such as brochures about their communities and common practices. However, as the organic cultivation organization, Biopark, demonstrates with their vetting process, it’s difficult to keep people out of communities because of their ideologies. Biopark specifies that they vet based on cultivation habits, not opinions or doctrines, especially when they’re not explicitly stated.

Collegium Humanum

Other groups 

Hungary 

Following the fall of Communism in Hungary at the end of the 1980s, one of the new political parties that emerged in the country was the Green Party of Hungary. Initially having a moderate centre-right green outlook, after 1993 the party adopted a radical anti-liberal, anti-communist, anti-Semitic and pro-fascist stance, paired with the creation of a paramilitary wing. This ideological swing resulted in many members breaking off from the party to form new green parties, first with Green Alternative in 1993 and secondly with Hungarian Social Green Party in 1995. Each green party remained on the political fringe of Hungarian politics and petered out over time. It was not until the formation of LMP – Hungary's Green Party in the 2010s that green politics in Hungary consolidated around a single green party.

The far-right Hungarian political party Our Homeland Movement has adopted some elements of environmentalism; for example, the party has called on Hungarians to show patriotism by supporting the removal of pollution from the Tisza River while simultaneously placing the blame on the pollution on Romania and Ukraine. Similarly, elements of the far-right Sixty-Four Counties Youth Movement proscribe themselves to the "Eco-Nationalist" label, with one member stating "no real nationalist is a climate denialist".

International 
Greenline Front is an international network of ecofascists which originated in Eastern Europe, with chapters in a variety of countries such as Argentina, Belarus, Chile, Germany, Italy, Poland, Russia, Serbia, Spain and Switzerland.

Serbia 
Leviathan Movement promotes ecology and protects animals from cruelty by, among other things, saving them from abusers. Leviathan has been reported as an ideologically neo-fascist and neo-nazi group. They used to share an office with the Serbian Right, a far-right political party, and Leviathan ’s leader, Pavle Bihali, is seen in pictures on his social media accounts posing with neo-Nazis.

Switzerland 
In Switzerland, the initiators of the Ecopop initiative were accused of eco-fascism by FDFA State Secretary  at a Christian Democratic People's Party of Switzerland event on 11 January 2013. However, after threatening to sue, Rossier apologized for the allegation.

United Kingdom 
There is also a historic tradition between the far-right and environmentalism in the UK.  Throughout its history, the far-right British National Party has flirted on and off with environmentalism. During the 1970s the party's first leader John Bean expressed support for the emerging environmentalist movement in the pages of the party's newspaper and suggested the primary cause of pollution as overpopulation, and therefore immigration into Britain must be halted. During the 2000s the BNP sought to position itself as the "only 'true' green party in the United Kingdom, dedicating a significant portion of their manifestos to green issues. During an appearance on BBC One's Question Time in October 2009, then-leader Nick Griffin proclaimed:

The Guardian criticised Griffin's claims that himself and the BNP were truly environmentalists at heart, suggesting it was merely a smokescreen for anti-immigrant rhetoric and pointed to previous statements by Griffin in which he suggested that climate change was a hoax. These suspicions seemed to be proven correct when in December 2009 the BNP released a 40-page document denying that global warming is a "man-made" phenomenon. The party reiterated this stance in 2011, as well as making claims that wind farms were the of cause the deaths of "thousands of Scottish pensioners from hypothermia".

United States 

During the 1990s a highly militant environmentalist subculture called Hardline emerged out of the straight edge hardcore punk music scene and established itself in a number of cities across the US. Adherents to the Hardline lifestyle combined the straight edge belief in no alcohol, no drugs, no tobacco with militant veganism and advocacy for animal rights. Hardline touted a biocentric worldview that claimed to value all life, and therefore opposed abortion, contraceptives, and sex for any purpose other than procreation. On this same line, Hardline opposed homosexuality as "unnatural" and a "deviant”. Hardline groups were highly militant; In 1999 Salt Lake City grouped Hardliners as a criminal gang and suggested they were behind dozens of assaults in the metro area. That same year CBS News reported that Hardliners were behind the firebombing of fast food outlets and clothing stores selling leather items, and attributed 30 attacks to Hardliners. The Hardline subculture dissolved after the 1990s.

Political researcher Blair Taylor identifies multiple threads in alt-right discourse and ideology that aligns with far-right ecologism and ecofascism.

Pejorative 
Detractors on the political right tend to use the term "ecofascism" as a hyperbolic general pejorative against all environmental activists, including more mainstream groups such as Greenpeace and the Sierra Club. Such detractors include Rush Limbaugh and other conservative and wise use movement commentators.

See also 

 Adolf Hitler and vegetarianism
 Animal welfare in Nazi Germany
 ATWA
 Blood and soil
 Conspirituality
 Definitions of fascism
 Ecoauthoritarianism
 Eco-nationalism
 Eco-terrorism
 Environmental movement
 Environmental racism
 Green Imperialism
 Individualists Tending to the Wild
 Malthusianism
 Neo-Luddism
 Pastel QAnon
 Radical environmentalism
 Red-green-brown alliance
 Terrorgram

Notes

References

Bibliography

External links 
 
 

Fascism
Green politics
Political slurs
Far-right politics
Deep ecology
Environmental movements
Syncretic political movements
Environmentalism
Terrorism in Sweden
Terrorism in the United States
Terrorism in New Zealand
Eco-terrorism
Political ecology